Abel Nazario Trujillo (born September 18, 1983) is an American mixed martial artist who most recently competed in the Lightweight division of the Ultimate Fighting Championship.

Background
Born in Greensboro, North Carolina, Trujillo attended Riverside High School in Durham, North Carolina where he competed in wrestling. In 2002, Trujillo won the NCHSAA 4A state wrestling championship at 145lbs. He also helped his team win the 2002 NCHSAA 4A state tournament championship. Trujillo continued his career at the collegiate level for William Penn University in Oskaloosa, Iowa where he was a four-time NAIA All-American.

Mixed martial arts career

Early career
Trujillo lost by knockout against future World Extreme Cagefighting competitor Zach Micklewright in his amateur debut, on July 22, 2006. Almost three years later, he rebounded and won his next amateur bout by submission in just 54 seconds.

Trujillo made his professional MMA debut in 2009, losing via armbar to Ted Wothington. He went 5–3 in his next eight fights, before winning four straight over Lucas Gwaltney, Andre Garcia, James Edson Berto and Frank Carrillo in less than a year.

Ultimate Fighting Championship
In the summer of 2012, Trujillo was signed by the UFC on the strength of a four-fight win streak. He was expected to make his promotional debut on September 1, 2012, at UFC 151 against Tim Means. However, after UFC 151 was cancelled, Trujillo/Means was rescheduled for UFC on Fox: Henderson vs. Diaz on December 8, 2012. Then on the day of the weigh in for the event, Means was forced out of the bout after sustaining a head injury caused by a fall in a hotel sauna and was replaced by Marcus LeVesseur. Trujillo was successful in his debut, defeating LeVesseur via TKO (knees to the body) at 3:56 of the second round. In the fight, he successfully connected on 57 of his 75 significant strikes and also defended eight of his opponent's ten takedown attempts.

Trujillo faced Khabib Nurmagomedov on May 25, 2013, at UFC 160. He lost the fight by unanimous decision. A fight in which Trujillo was taken down a record 21 times, breaking a record once held by former lightweight champion Sean Sherk.

Trujillo faced Roger Bowling on August 28, 2013, at UFC Fight Night 27. The fight ended in controversial fashion as Trujillo landed what appeared to be an illegal knee to the face of Bowling at the end of round two. With Bowling unable to continue, the referee deemed the bout a no contest.

A rematch with Bowling took place on December 14, 2013, at UFC on Fox 9. Trujillo won via TKO in the second round.

Trujillo was expected to face Bobby Green on February 1, 2014, at UFC 169. However, Green pulled out of the bout for undisclosed reasons and was replaced by Jamie Varner. Trujillo won the back-and-forth fight via knockout in the second round.  The win also earned him Fight of the Night and Knockout of the Night bonus awards totaling $125,000. The win also earned Trujillo his first knockout and fight of the night awards and with this win became the first man to stop Varner by KO.

Trujillo was expected to face Myles Jury on June 28, 2014, at UFC Fight Night 44.  However, Jury pulled out of the bout with an injury and was replaced by Frank Trevino.  Then on June 8, Trevino pulled out of the bout with an injury and Trujillo was removed from the event entirely.

A bout with Bobby Green was expected to take place on August 2, 2014, at UFC 176. However, after UFC 176 was cancelled, Green/Trujillo was rescheduled and was then expected to take place on August 16, 2014, at UFC Fight Night 47. However, Green was removed from his fight on July 11 as he stepped in as an injury replacement for Michael Johnson against Josh Thomson at UFC on Fox: Lawler vs. Brown on July 26, 2014. Trujillo was expected to face Ross Pearson at the event. However, on August 4, he pulled out of the bout due to injury.

Trujillo faced Tony Ferguson on December 6, 2014, at UFC 181. Despite winning the first round, Trujillo lost the fight via submission in the second round.

Trujillo was expected to face John Makdessi on April 25, 2015, at UFC 186.  However, on April 1, it was announced that Trujillo had pulled out of the fight citing an injury and was replaced by promotional newcomer Shane Campbell.

Trujillo faced Gleison Tibau at UFC Fight Night 77 on November 7, 2015. He lost the fight via submission in the first round. Tibau had taken Trujillo's back, secured a body triangle from the bottom and secured a rear-naked choke grip with his arm underneath Trujillo's chin. After a few seconds in this position, referee Keith Peterson halted the contest as he believed that Trujillo was unconscious when in fact he was not. Trujillo indicated that he planned to appeal the decision in hopes that the result may be changed to a No Contest by the Brazilian MMA Athletic Commission (CABMMA). Subsequently, on December 23, 2015, it was reported that Tibau had failed an in-competition test following the win over Trujillo. On February 18, 2016, Tibau was suspended for 2 years by USADA and as a result the loss was reversed to a win for Trujillo.

Trujillo faced Tony Sims on January 2, 2015, at UFC 195. He won the fight via submission in the first round.

Trujillo was expected to face Ross Pearson on March 20, 2016, at UFC Fight Night 85. However, Trujillo was removed from the card on March 12 due to alleged visa issues which restricted his entry to Australia. As a result, Pearson faced Chad Laprise.

Trujillo was expected to face Carlos Diego Ferreira on May 29, 2016, at UFC Fight Night 88. However, Ferreira was removed from the fight on May 13 after it was announced that he had been flagged for a potential anti-doping policy violation. He was replaced by promotional newcomer Jordan Rinaldi. Trujillo won the fight via unanimous decision.

Trujillo was expected to face Evan Dunham on September 17, 2016, at UFC Fight Night 94. However, Trujillo pulled out of the fight on September 5, citing an undisclosed injury and was replaced by former WSOF Featherweight Champion and promotional newcomer Rick Glenn.

The bout with Dunham was rescheduled and was expected to take place on February 4, 2017, at UFC Fight Night 104. However, on January 19, Dunham pulled out of the fight with an injury and was replaced by James Vick. He lost the fight via submission in the third round.

Trujillo was expected to face Lando Vannata on October 7, 2017, at UFC 216. However, Trujillo was removed from the card on August 14 for undisclosed reasons and replaced by Bobby Green.

Trujillo faced John Makdessi on December 16, 2017, at UFC on Fox 26. He lost the fight by unanimous decision.

Post-UFC career
Trujillo was expected to face Will Brooks at Battlefield FC 2 on July 27, 2019, but withdrew from the bout and was replaced by Gleison Tibau.

Personal life

Domestic abuse 
Trujillo has twice plead guilty to charges of domestic abuse; in both cases the incidents involved the mother of his child.

Sexual exploitation of a child 
On July 16, 2019, he was charged with the sexual exploitation of a child, and on March 6, 2020,  Trujillo pleaded guilty to promoting obscenity. His sentencing was scheduled for April 6, 2020. Trujillo was sentenced to two years of probation on August 31, 2020.

Championships and accomplishments

Mixed martial arts
Ultimate Fighting Championship
Fight of the Night (One time)
Knockout of the Night (One time)
MMAJunkie.com
2014 February Knockout of the Month vs. Jamie Varner

Mixed martial arts record

|- 
|Loss
|align=center|15–8 (1)
|John Makdessi
|Decision (unanimous)
|UFC on Fox: Lawler vs. dos Anjos 
|
|align=center|3
|align=center|5:00
|Winnipeg, Manitoba, Canada
|
|-
|Loss
|align=center|15–7 (1)
|James Vick
|Submission (D'Arce choke)
|UFC Fight Night: Bermudez vs. Korean Zombie
|
|align=center|3
|align=center|0:49
|Houston, Texas, United States
| 
|-
|Win
|align=center|15–6 (1)
|Jordan Rinaldi
|Decision (unanimous)
|UFC Fight Night: Almeida vs. Garbrandt
|
|align=center|3
|align=center|5:00
|Las Vegas, Nevada, United States
|  
|-
|Win
|align=center| 14–6 (1)
|Tony Sims
|Submission (guillotine choke)
|UFC 195 
|
|align=center|1
|align=center|3:18
|Las Vegas, Nevada, United States
|
|-
|Win
|align=center| 13–6 (1)
|Gleison Tibau
|DQ (overturned)
|UFC Fight Night: Belfort vs. Henderson 3
|
|align=center|1
|align=center|1:45
|São Paulo, Brazil
|
|-
|Loss
|align=center| 12–6 (1)
|Tony Ferguson
|Submission (rear-naked choke)
|UFC 181
|
|align=center|2
|align=center|4:19
|Las Vegas, Nevada, United States
|
|-
|Win
|align=center| 12–5 (1)
|Jamie Varner
|KO (punch)
|UFC 169
|
|align=center| 2
|align=center| 2:32
|Newark, New Jersey, United States
|
|-
|Win
|align=center| 11–5 (1)
|Roger Bowling
|TKO (punches)
|UFC on Fox: Johnson vs. Benavidez 2
|
|align=center| 2
|align=center| 1:35
|Sacramento, California, United States
|
|-
|NC
|align=center| 10–5 (1)
|Roger Bowling
|NC (illegal knee)
|UFC Fight Night: Condit vs. Kampmann 2
|
|align=center| 2
|align=center| 4:57
|Indianapolis, Indiana, United States
|
|-
|Loss
|align=center| 10–5
|Khabib Nurmagomedov
|Decision (unanimous)
|UFC 160
|
|align=center| 3
|align=center| 5:00
|Las Vegas, Nevada, United States
|
|-
|Win
|align=center| 10–4
|Marcus LeVesseur
|TKO (knees to the body)
|UFC on Fox: Henderson vs. Diaz
|
|align=center| 2
|align=center| 3:56
|Seattle, Washington, United States
|
|-
|Win
|align=center| 9–4
|Frank Carrillo
|Decision (unanimous)
|CFA 7: Never Give Up
|
|align=center| 3
|align=center| 5:00
|Coral Gables, Florida, United States
|
|-
|Win
|align=center| 8–4
|James Edson Berto
|Submission (punches)
|CFA 6: Palomino vs. Warfield
|
|align=center| 1
|align=center| 1:10
|Coral Gables, Florida, United States
|
|-
|Win
|align=center| 7–4
|Andre Garcia
|Decision (unanimous)
|C3 Fights: Slamfest
|
|align=center| 3
|align=center| 5:00
|Newkirk, Oklahoma, United States
|
|-
| Win
|align=center| 6–4
|Lucas Gwaltney
|Decision (unanimous)
|Fight Me MMA: Trujillo vs. Gwaltney
|
|align=center| 3
|align=center| 5:00
|St. Charles, Missouri, United States
|
|-
| Loss
|align=center| 5–4
|Alonzo Martinez
|Submission (guillotine choke)
|Extreme Challenge 181
|
|align=center| 1
|align=center| 3:30
|Council Bluffs, Iowa, United States
|
|-
|Loss
|align=center| 5–3
|Scott Cleve
|Decision (split)
|Extreme Beatdown at 4 Bears 8
|
|align=center| 3
|align=center| 5:00
|New Town, North Dakota, United States
|
|-
| Win
|align=center| 5–2
|Marcos Marquez
|Decision (unanimous)
|Extreme Challenge: Bad Blood
|
|align=center| 3
|align=center| 5:00
|Council Bluffs, Iowa, United States
|
|-
| Win
|align=center| 4–2
|Andre Garcia
| Submission (guillotine choke)
|Xtreme Fight Promotions: The Holiday Fight Fest
|
|align=center| 1
|align=center| 2:36
|Wilmington, North Carolina, United States
|
|-
| Win
|align=center| 3–2
|Wes Clark
|Submission (punches)
|TriState Cage Fights
|
|align=center| 1
|align=center| 2:01
|Lincoln, Nebraska, United States
|
|-
| Win
|align=center| 2–2
|Dave Lehr Cochran
|KO (punches)
|Fight Me MMA 1: The Battle Begins
|
|align=center| 1
|align=center| 1:29
|St. Charles, Missouri, United States
| 
|-
| Loss
|align=center| 1–2
|Clayton Robinson
|TKO (punches)
|C3 Fights: Knockout-Rockout Weekend 4
|
|align=center| 1
|align=center| 2:47
|Clinton, Oklahoma, United States
|
|-
| Win
|align=center| 1–1
|Dustin Praxedes
|TKO (punches)
|Xtreme Promotions: Throwdown in Jamestown 2
|
|align=center| 1
|align=center| 4:15
|Sequim, Washington, United States
| 
|-
| Loss
|align=center| 0–1
|Ted Worthington
|Submission (armbar)
|Max FightsDM: Ballroom Brawl 2
|
|align=center| 1
|align=center| 3:06
|Des Moines, Iowa, United States
|

Amateur mixed martial arts record

|Win
|align=center| 1–1
|Randy Meade
|Submission (guillotine choke)
|Extreme Challenge 127
|
|align=center| 1
|align=center| 0:54
|Iowa, United States
|
|-
|Loss
|align=center| 0–1
|Zach Micklewright
|KO 
|Extreme Challenge 69
|
|align=center| 2
|align=center| 0:28
|Davenport, Iowa, United States
|

See also
 List of current UFC fighters
 List of male mixed martial artists

References

External links 

 
 
 

1983 births
Living people
People from Greensboro, North Carolina
American male mixed martial artists
Lightweight mixed martial artists
Mixed martial artists utilizing collegiate wrestling
Mixed martial artists from North Carolina
Ultimate Fighting Championship male fighters
American male sport wrestlers
Amateur wrestlers
People convicted of domestic violence
American people convicted of child sexual abuse
American_people_convicted_of_child_pornography_offenses
American sportspeople convicted of crimes